The 15th Arabian Gulf Cup was held in Riyadh, Saudi Arabia, in January 2002.

The tournament was won by Saudi Arabia for the 2nd time.

Iraq continued to be banned from the tournament because of its invasion of Kuwait in 1990.

Tournament

The teams played a single round-robin style competition. The team achieving first place in the overall standings was the tournament winner.

Standings

Results

Champions

References

Arabian Gulf Cup
Gulf Cup Of Nations, 2002
Gulf Cup Of Nations, 2002
International association football competitions hosted by Saudi Arabia